DreamSong is an Australian musical by Hugo Chiarella (book and lyrics) and Robert Tripolino (music).  DreamSong is a musical satire about an evangelical megachurch that stage the second coming of Christ and market him as a Christian pop star. Meanwhile, the actual second coming of Christ occurs.

Synopsis
The story centres around an evangelical mega church, DreamSong, and its Pastor, Richard Sunday. The church has lost millions in the bad investments and Pastor Sunday decides to stage the second coming of Christ and market him as a Christian Pop Star, as a way through their money problems. At the same time, summoned by the arrival of the anti-Christ, the real second coming of Jesus returns. While the fake Jesus cast his pop-ballad spell over the people of the world, the real Jesus has learned his lesson from his last experience on earth and is determined to keep a low-profile. As the two Messiahs come face to face in a final reckoning, the public are forced to decide what to put their faith in; truth or spectacle.

Productions
While at university at the VCA, Chiarella began collaborating with fellow student, Robert Tripolino, on DreamSong. Chiarella wrote the book and lyrics and Tripolino composed the music. The VCA agreed to support the development of the musical and staged a full production in 2011 directed by Michael Gurr with musical direction by Daniel Puckey. 

The show was selected as part of the Carnegie 19 New Music Theatre programme at Arts Centre Melbourne, where the show went through an workshop followed by a four night showcase, once again directed by Michael Gurr with musical direction by Andrew Patterson.

DreamSong then received a full production at Theatre Works in 2014 directed by Dean Bryant and choreographed by Andrew Hallsworth, with musical supervision by Mathew Frank and musical direction by Robert Tripolino.

DreamSong was revived in 2019 by EbbFlow Theatre Company in Melbourne with a production directed by Lauren McKenna at The Alex Theatre, St Kilda. The production featured musical direction by Maverick Newman and choreography by Maddison Lee. Chiarella and Tripolino updated the show extensively for the production, including the addition of a female Jesus Christ.

Original casts

Musical numbers

Act I
DreamSong Song – Full Company
Resurrection – Pastor Richard, Whitney, Cunningham, Clarice
April's Prayer – April
The Father Tells Us So – Full Company
The Audition – Full Company
Coming Home – April, Paul
Funeral Song – Full Company 
Show Me Why – April
Resurrection (reprise) - Pastor Richard, Whitney, Cunningham, Clarice, Neville
I Hate Conflict – Jesus
Just Have Faith – Chris T.

Act II
The Carnival's In Town – Pastor Richard
The Miracles – Chris T.
Jesus Is My Boyfriend – April
Pastor Richard's Soliloquy – Pastor Richard
Resurrection (reprise 2) – Neville
Jesus' Epiphany – Jesus
Resurrection (reprise 3) – Pastor Richard
It Isn't Fair – Whitney
Just Have Faith (reprise) – Chris T.
Wonders Will Never Cease'  – JesusForgive – Full company

Reception
Despite its controversial subject matter, the show received mostly positive reviews. Cameron Woodhead wrote in The Age, "Viable new musicals don't come along every day. Dreamsong isn't perfect, but this satire on the far-right Christian lobby has more hits than misses... Music and action are seamlessly intertwined, and Dreamsong'' has an engaging storyline, brought to life with dynamic acting, vocals and choreography. The humour can be bleak (there are songs picketing gay funerals and abortion clinics), but the acid satire works well against the natural comic brio of Hill's shambolic, scaredy-cat Jesus".

Regarding the updated version of the show in 2019, Casey Bohan wrote for Theatre Travels, "Chiarella & Tripolino’s story is filled with heart and joy and it handles the delicate balance between making a statement and making fun with grace. It is clear this story, while taking place in a religious setting, is not about religion, but the human experience, temptations, tolerance and kindness above all else. No one is being laughed at, but the ludicrousness of some extreme intolerances are being pointed out and highlighted. It is a story for today, for its audiences and it is one worth paying attention to."

References

2014 musicals
Australian musicals
Original musicals
Plays about religion and science